Odorrana swinhoana is a species of frog in the family Ranidae. It is endemic to Taiwan and widely distributed in hilly areas below . It is named for Robert Swinhoe, a British naturalist and diplomat. Its common names include Swinhoe's brown frog, Bangkimtsing frog, brown-backed odorous frog, Taiwan odorous frog, and Taiwan sucker frog.

Description
They can live up to 11 years. Sizes vary by location; males from a low-lying location measured on average  in snout–vent length, respectively, and from a highland location , respectively. The dorsum is bright green and the flanks are brown or green, broken up by white or dark mottling. The dorsal skin is finely pebbled. The venter is white. The finger tips bear well developed discs. The toes have well developed webbing.

The tadpoles are adapted to running water and have a ventral sucking disc. The back is green.

Habitat and conservation
Odorrana swinhoana occur in hill streams in broadleaf forests. They forage on both terrestrial and aquatic prey, primarily on insects and arachnids, but also gastropods, crustaceans, and chilopods. Breeding takes place in small mountainous, shady, rocky creeks. Males call day and night, usually hidden in crevices among the rocks. The eggs are attached to rocks under the water.

It is a common species that is not facing serious threats, although agriculture and infrastructure development represent some threats. It is present in a number of protected areas.

References

swinhoana
Endemic fauna of Taiwan
Amphibians of Taiwan
Amphibians described in 1903
Taxa named by George Albert Boulenger
Taxonomy articles created by Polbot